Taxandria may refer to 

 Taxandria (plant), an Australian genus of shrubs
Texandria, a region located in the southern Netherlands and northern Belgium during Late antiquity and the Middle Ages
 Taxandria (film), a 1994 Belgian animated film